Abraham the Great may refer to:
Abraham the Great of Kaskhar (c.492-586), monk and saint of the Assyrian Church of the East
Abraham Kidunaia (died c. 366), hermit, priest, and Christian saint of Mesopotamia